Robert Albert "Bob" Long (April 9, 1922 - August 2, 1961) was an American professional football halfback who spent one season in the National Football League with the Boston Yanks in 1947. Long died on August 2, 1961 at the age of 39.

References

1961 deaths
1922 births
Players of American football from Trenton, New Jersey
Boston Yanks players
University of Tennessee alumni